Pridefest is a social simulation game. Atari announced the game on July 17, 2014 shortly after the company sponsored and participated in GaymerX2. The game is for tablet computers operating iOS or Android. The game was released on January 27, 2016.

Gameplay
Players are able to launch and manage an LGBT pride parade in a city of their choosing. They can customize parade floats by choosing size, components, mascots and decorations, as well as surrounding structures and side attractions, which then factor into a city happiness metric. Players can complete quests or challenge goals to unlock new parades, receive festival supplies or secure bonuses. Social elements of the game include avatar customization, chatting with friends and the ability to bring your parade to a friend's city, or to join in on a friend's parade. Atari does not plan to include the political aspects of LGBT pride parades. According to the company, "Pridefest will be a fun, social game first and foremost. We do not have a political component in the game."

Development
This is the first LGBT-themed video game from Atari, Inc. and their second major outreach to the LGBT gaming community after sponsoring and participating in GaymerX2. The company is putting together an advisory board that includes people from the LGBT gamer community to help avoid stereotypes and "to develop an engaging and fun game that is inclusive to all gamers".

References

2016 video games
Android (operating system) games
Atari games
IOS games
LGBT-related video games
Multiplayer and single-player video games
Social simulation video games
Video games developed in the United States